The following is a list of mayors of the city of Campo Grande, in the state of Mato Grosso do Sul, Brazil.

 Francisco Mestre, 1899–1904
 , 1904–1909	
 João Carlos Sebastião, 1909
 José Santiago, 1909–1910, 1912–1914
 Antônio Norberto de Almeida, 1910–1911, 1919–1920
 João Clímaco Vidal, 1915
 Sebastião da Costa Lima, 1915–1917
 Fernando Novais, 1917	
 Leonel Velasco, 1918
 , 1918, 1931–1932, 1934–1935, 1941–1942
 , 1918–1919
 , 1920–1921	
 , 1921–1924
 Arnaldo Estevão de Figueiredo, 1924–1926	
 Jonas Corrêa da Costa, 1927–1929		
 Inácio Franco de Carvalho, 1929		
 Antonio Antero de Barros, 1930
 Mário Pinto Peixoto da Cunha, 1930
 Deusdedit de Carvalho, 1930
 Cesar Bacchi de Araújo, 1930–1931
 Valdomiro Siqueira, 1931
 Arthur Jorge Mendes Sobrinho, 1932
 Ytrio Corrêa da Costa, 1932–1933	
 Pacífico Lopes de Siqueira, 1933–1934	
 Antônio Luís Almeida Boaventura, 1935–1937	
 Lourival Azambuja, 1937	
 Juvenal Vieira de Almeida, 1937	
 Eduardo Olímpio Machado, 1937–1941
 Demósthenes Martins, 1941, 1942–1945
 Joaquim Teodoro de Faria, 1945–1947
 Carlos Hugueney Filho, 1947
 , 1947–1951
 , 1951–1952
 Mário Carrato, 1952	
 Nelson Borges de Barros, 1952–1953
 , 1953–1955
 Marcílio de Oliveira Lima, 1955–1959
 Wilson Barbosa Martins, 1959–1963
 Luiz Alexandre de Oliveira, 1963	
 , 1963–1967
 , 1967–1970
 Mendes Canale, 1970–1973
 , 1973–1977, 1980–1982
 Marcelo Miranda, 1977–1979
 Albino Coimbra Filho, 1979–1980
 Leon Denizart Conte, 1980
 Valdir Pires Cardoso, 1982
 Heráclito de Figueiredo, 1982–1983
 Nelly Bacha, 1983
 , 1983–1985, 1989–1992
 , 1986–1988, 1993–1996	
 André Puccinelli, 1997–2004
 Nelson Trad Filho, 2005–2012
 , 2013–2014, 2015–2016
 , 2014–2015
 Marcos Trad, 2017–2022
 Adriane Lopes, 2022—present

See also
 
  (city council)
 Campo Grande history
 
  (state)
 List of mayors of largest cities in Brazil (in Portuguese)
 List of mayors of capitals of Brazil (in Portuguese)

References

This article incorporates information from the Portuguese Wikipedia.

Campo Grande